The California Center for Innovative Transportation (CCIT) was a research organization at the University of California, Berkeley Institute of Transportation Studies.

CCIT was formed in 2001 as a group within California Partners for Advanced Traffic and Highways (PATH), another UC Berkeley transportation research center; in 2003 they became an independent center, with a focus on accelerating the implementation of research findings and technical solutions that improve the safety and efficiency of California's surface transportation. It came full circle when it re-merged with PATH in 2011 to form Partners for Advanced Transportation Technology, retaining the PATH acronym instead of "PATT".

CCIT was formed by Hamed Benouar, a former Caltrans executive who is also a former California State Chief Traffic Engineer. The last CCIT Director was Thomas West, also a former Caltrans executive and current Co-Director at PATH.

References

Accelerating Deployment, 2007 Annual Report, California Center for Innovative Transportation
"Inventing the Future of Mobility" Institute of Transportation Studies

External links
California PATH
Caltrans
UC Berkeley Institute of Transportation Studies

Research institutes in the San Francisco Bay Area
University of California, Berkeley
Research institutes established in 2001
2001 establishments in California